Viktor Yuzefovich Dragunsky (1 December 1913 - 6 May 1972) was a Soviet writer. He was born into a Jewish family who emigrated to the United States from Gomel, Belarus. The family returned to Gomel in 1914. He best known for The Adventures of Dennis, a series of children's stories.

References

External links 

1913 births
1972 deaths
Soviet children's writers
American emigrants to the Russian Empire
American people of Belarusian-Jewish descent